Gustaf Ingvar Bertil Gärd (6 October 1921 – 31 August 2006) was a Swedish football midfielder who played for Sweden in the 1950 FIFA World Cup. He also played for Malmö FF.

References

External links
FIFA profile

1921 births
2006 deaths
Swedish footballers
Association football midfielders
Malmö FF players
U.C. Sampdoria players
Serie A players
Sweden international footballers
1950 FIFA World Cup players
Swedish expatriate footballers
Expatriate footballers in Italy
Swedish expatriate sportspeople in Italy
Swedish football managers
IFK Malmö Fotboll players
Trelleborgs FF players